Romanovka is the name of several inhabited localities in Russia.

Modern localities

Altai Krai
As of 2012, one rural locality in Altai Krai bears this name:
Romanovka, Altai Krai, a selo in Novonikolayevsky Selsoviet of Rubtsovsky District;

Amur Oblast
As of 2012, one rural locality in Amur Oblast bears this name:
Romanovka, Amur Oblast, a selo in Romanovsky Rural Settlement of Oktyabrsky District

Republic of Bashkortostan
As of 2012, five rural localities in the Republic of Bashkortostan bear this name:
Romanovka, Birsky District, Republic of Bashkortostan, a village in Uguzevsky Selsoviet of Birsky District
Romanovka, Chishminsky District, Republic of Bashkortostan, a selo in Chuvalkipovsky Selsoviet of Chishminsky District
Romanovka, Davlekanovsky District, Republic of Bashkortostan, a village in Alginsky Selsoviet of Davlekanovsky District
Romanovka, Karmaskalinsky District, Republic of Bashkortostan, a village in Kabakovsky Selsoviet of Karmaskalinsky District
Romanovka, Meleuzovsky District, Republic of Bashkortostan, a village in Partizansky Selsoviet of Meleuzovsky District

Belgorod Oblast
As of 2012, one rural locality in Belgorod Oblast bears this name:
Romanovka, Belgorod Oblast, a selo in Krasnoyaruzhsky District

Bryansk Oblast
As of 2012, three rural localities in Bryansk Oblast bear this name:
Romanovka, Dyatkovsky District, Bryansk Oblast, a village in Bolshezhukovsky Rural Administrative Okrug of Dyatkovsky District; 
Romanovka, Kletnyansky District, Bryansk Oblast, a village in Lutensky Rural Administrative Okrug of Kletnyansky District; 
Romanovka, Pogarsky District, Bryansk Oblast, a village in Stechensky Rural Administrative Okrug of Pogarsky District;

Republic of Buryatia
As of 2012, one rural locality in the Republic of Buryatia bears this name:
Romanovka, Republic of Buryatia, a selo in Vitimsky Selsoviet of Bauntovsky District

Chelyabinsk Oblast
As of 2012, one rural locality in Chelyabinsk Oblast bears this name:
Romanovka, Chelyabinsk Oblast, a selo in Romanovsky Selsoviet of Satkinsky District

Republic of Dagestan
Lyuksemburg, a village in Babayurtovsky District formerly known as Romanovka

Kaluga Oblast
As of 2012, three rural localities in Kaluga Oblast bear this name:
Romanovka, Lyudinovsky District, Kaluga Oblast, a village in Lyudinovsky District
Romanovka, Tarussky District, Kaluga Oblast, a village in Tarussky District
Romanovka, Ulyanovsky District, Kaluga Oblast, a village in Ulyanovsky District

Kostanay Region (Kazakhstan) 

 Romanovka, or Boris-Romanovka is a village in the Kostanay Region,

Krasnoyarsk Krai
As of 2012, three rural localities in Krasnoyarsk Krai bear this name:
Romanovka, Idrinsky District, Krasnoyarsk Krai, a selo in Romanovsky Selsoviet of Idrinsky District
Romanovka, Nizhneingashsky District, Krasnoyarsk Krai, a village in Novoalexandrovsky Selsoviet of Nizhneingashsky District
Romanovka, Tyukhtetsky District, Krasnoyarsk Krai, a village in Tyukhtetsky Selsoviet of Tyukhtetsky District

Kurgan Oblast
As of 2012, one rural locality in Kurgan Oblast bears this name:
Romanovka, Kurgan Oblast, a village in Sadovsky Selsoviet of Ketovsky District;

Kursk Oblast
As of 2012, two rural localities in Kursk Oblast bear this name:
Romanovka, Dmitriyevsky District, Kursk Oblast, a selo in Novopershinsky Selsoviet of Dmitriyevsky District
Romanovka, Medvensky District, Kursk Oblast, a village in Kitayevsky Selsoviet of Medvensky District

Leningrad Oblast
As of 2012, two rural localities in Leningrad Oblast bear this name:
Romanovka, Gatchinsky District, Leningrad Oblast, a village in Verevskoye Settlement Municipal Formation of Gatchinsky District; 
Romanovka, Vsevolozhsky District, Leningrad Oblast, a settlement in Romanovskoye Settlement Municipal Formation of Vsevolozhsky District;

Republic of Mordovia
As of 2012, two rural localities in the Republic of Mordovia bear this name:
Romanovka, Lyambirsky District, Republic of Mordovia, a village in Mikhaylovsky Selsoviet of Lyambirsky District; 
Romanovka, Zubovo-Polyansky District, Republic of Mordovia, a settlement in Kargashinsky Selsoviet of Zubovo-Polyansky District;

Moscow Oblast
As of 2012, three rural localities in Moscow Oblast bear this name:
Romanovka, Kashirsky District, Moscow Oblast, a village in Topkanovskoye Rural Settlement of Kashirsky District; 
Romanovka, Kolomensky District, Moscow Oblast, a village in Biorkovskoye Rural Settlement of Kolomensky District; 
Romanovka, Serpukhovsky District, Moscow Oblast, a village in Dashkovskoye Rural Settlement of Serpukhovsky District;

Nizhny Novgorod Oblast
As of 2012, four rural localities in Nizhny Novgorod Oblast bear this name:
Romanovka, Lukoyanovsky District, Nizhny Novgorod Oblast, a selo in Kudeyarovsky Selsoviet of Lukoyanovsky District; 
Romanovka, Deyanovsky Selsoviet, Pilninsky District, Nizhny Novgorod Oblast, a village in Deyanovsky Selsoviet of Pilninsky District; 
Romanovka, Medyansky Selsoviet, Pilninsky District, Nizhny Novgorod Oblast, a selo in Medyansky Selsoviet of Pilninsky District; 
Romanovka, Pochinkovsky District, Nizhny Novgorod Oblast, a village in Naruksovsky Selsoviet of Pochinkovsky District;

Novosibirsk Oblast
As of 2012, two rural localities in Novosibirsk Oblast bear this name:
Romanovka, Bagansky District, Novosibirsk Oblast, a village in Bagansky District
Romanovka, Chistoozyorny District, Novosibirsk Oblast, a selo in Chistoozyorny District

Orenburg Oblast
As of 2012, four rural localities in Orenburg Oblast bear this name:
Romanovka, Ponomaryovsky District, Orenburg Oblast, a selo in Romanovsky Selsoviet of Ponomaryovsky District
Romanovka, Sharlyksky District, Orenburg Oblast, a selo in Bogorodsky Selsoviet of Sharlyksky District
Romanovka, Sorochinsky District, Orenburg Oblast, a selo in Romanovsky Selsoviet of Sorochinsky District
Romanovka, Tyulgansky District, Orenburg Oblast, a selo in Blagodarnovsky Selsoviet of Tyulgansky District

Primorsky Krai
As of 2012, one rural locality in Primorsky Krai bears this name:
Romanovka, Primorsky Krai, a selo in Shkotovsky District

Rostov Oblast
As of 2012, one rural locality in Rostov Oblast bears this name:
Romanovka, Rostov Oblast, a selo in Novoyegorlykskoye Rural Settlement of Salsky District

Ryazan Oblast
As of 2012, two rural localities in Ryazan Oblast bear this name:
Romanovka, Sarayevsky District, Ryazan Oblast, a village in Alexeyevsky Rural Okrug of Sarayevsky District
Romanovka, Spassky District, Ryazan Oblast, a village in Razberdeyevsky Rural Okrug of Spassky District

Samara Oblast
As of 2012, two rural localities in Samara Oblast bear this name:
Romanovka, Khvorostyansky District, Samara Oblast, a selo in Khvorostyansky District
Romanovka, Shentalinsky District, Samara Oblast, a settlement in Shentalinsky District

Saratov Oblast
As of 2012, two inhabited localities in Saratov Oblast bear this name:
Romanovka, Romanovsky District, Saratov Oblast, an urban locality (a work settlement) in Romanovsky District
Romanovka, Fyodorovsky District, Saratov Oblast, a rural locality (a selo) in Fyodorovsky District

Tambov Oblast
As of 2012, two rural localities in Tambov Oblast bear this name:
Romanovka, Inzhavinsky District, Tambov Oblast, a settlement in Mikhaylovsky Selsoviet of Inzhavinsky District
Romanovka, Tokaryovsky District, Tambov Oblast, a village in Abakumovsky Selsoviet of Tokaryovsky District

Tomsk Oblast
As of 2012, one rural locality in Tomsk Oblast bears this name:
Romanovka, Tomsk Oblast, a village in Tomsky District

Tula Oblast
As of 2012, one rural locality in Tula Oblast bears this name:
Romanovka, Tula Oblast, a village in Arkhangelsky Rural Okrug of Kamensky District

Volgograd Oblast
As of 2012, two rural localities in Volgograd Oblast bear this name:
Romanovka, Olkhovsky District, Volgograd Oblast, a selo in Romanovsky Selsoviet of Olkhovsky District
Romanovka, Zhirnovsky District, Volgograd Oblast, a selo in Klenovsky Selsoviet of Zhirnovsky District

Voronezh Oblast
As of 2012, one rural locality in Voronezh Oblast bears this name:
Romanovka, Voronezh Oblast, a selo in Nashchekinskoye Rural Settlement of Anninsky District

Yaroslavl Oblast
As of 2012, one rural locality in Yaroslavl Oblast bears this name:
Romanovka, Yaroslavl Oblast, a village in Zarubinsky Rural Okrug of Myshkinsky District

Abolished localities
Romanovka, Tyumen Oblast, a village in Bolshekrasnoyarsky Rural Okrug of Omutinsky District, Tyumen Oblast; merged into the village of Tomskaya in October 2014

Alternative names
Romanovka, alternative name of Staraya Romanovka, a village in Novoromanovsky Rural Administrative Okrug of Mglinsky District in Bryansk Oblast; 
Romanovka, alternative name of Romanovsky, a settlement in Ust-Sosnovskaya Rural Territory of Topkinsky District in Kemerovo Oblast; 
Romanovka, alternative name of Novaya Romanovka, a selo in Novoromanovsky Rural Administrative Okrug of Mglinsky District in Bryansk Oblast; 

ru:Романовка#Россия